Lemon Hill is a census-designated place in an unincorporated area of Sacramento County, California, south of the city of Sacramento. The 2010 United States census reported Lemon Hill's population was 13,729.

Prior to the 2010 United States census, Lemon Hill was grouped with Parkway and Fruitridge Pocket in the Parkway-South Sacramento, California CDP.

Geography
According to the United States Census Bureau, the CDP covers an area of 1.6 square miles (4.2 km), all of it land.

Demographics

At the 2010 census Lemon Hill had a population of 13,729. The racial makeup of Lemon Hill was 5,091 (37.1%) White, 1,493 (10.9%) African American, 246 (1.8%) Native American, 2,394 (17.4%) Asian, 196 (1.4%) Pacific Islander, 3,487 (25.4%) from other races, and 822 (6.0%) from two or more races. Hispanic or Latino of any race were 6,790 persons (49.5%).

The census reported that 13,712 people (99.9% of the population) lived in households, 11 (0.1%) lived in non-institutionalized group quarters, and 6 (0%) were institutionalized.

There were 4,041 households, 1,958 (48.5%) had children under the age of 18 living in them, 1,567 (38.8%) were opposite-sex married couples living together, 924 (22.9%) had a female householder with no husband present, 420 (10.4%) had a male householder with no wife present.  There were 408 (10.1%) unmarried opposite-sex partnerships, and 35 (0.9%) same-sex married couples or partnerships. 809 households (20.0%) were one person and 265 (6.6%) had someone living alone who was 65 or older. The average household size was 3.39.  There were 2,911 families (72.0% of households); the average family size was 3.91.

The age distribution was 4,498 people (32.8%) under the age of 18, 1,564 people (11.4%) aged 18 to 24, 3,885 people (28.3%) aged 25 to 44, 2,712 people (19.8%) aged 45 to 64, and 1,070 people (7.8%) who were 65 or older.  The median age was 28.5 years. For every 100 females, there were 101.9 males.  For every 100 females age 18 and over, there were 102.0 males.

There were 4,588 housing units at an average density of 2,820.6 per square mile, of the occupied units 1,566 (38.8%) were owner-occupied and 2,475 (61.2%) were rented. The homeowner vacancy rate was 5.1%; the rental vacancy rate was 10.0%.  4,698 people (34.2% of the population) lived in owner-occupied housing units and 9,014 people (65.7%) lived in rental housing units.

References

Census-designated places in Sacramento County, California
Census-designated places in California